Robert Ralph Young (February 14, 1897 – January 25, 1958) was an American financier and industrialist. He is best known for leading the Chesapeake and Ohio Railway and the New York Central Railroad during and after World War II. He was a brother-in-law of the famous western painter, Georgia O'Keeffe.

Because of his initials, R.R. Young was often labeled "Railroad" Young. He was otherwise known as the "Populist of Wall Street," or, as his press agent encouraged journalists to call him, "The Daring Young Man of Wall Street". He regarded himself as a crusader against the mismanagement of railroads by banking interests. Young's most famous advertising slogan was "A hog can cross the country without changing trains - but you can't."

Despite his vocal criticisms, at the railroads he led, Young inaugurated many forward-looking advances in technology that have ramifications to the present. He was one of the first railroad executives to introduce high-speed diesel powered passenger trains which utilized lightweight equipment. He was also involved with the first large-scale railroad computer system, as well as diversification of freight traffic and development and implementation of larger and better freight cars of all types.

Biography

Early life 
Young's grandfather was a pioneer rancher in the Texas Panhandle. Young was the third of four children (John Stinson Young, b. 1890; Kenneth Moody Young, b. 1893; Robert Ralph Young, b. 1897; Florence Edith Young Exum, b. 1904) born to David John Young and the former Mary Arabella Moody in Canadian, the seat of Hemphill County in the eastern Panhandle. He was born in a house built by Temple Lea Houston, youngest son of Sam Houston, first president of the Republic of Texas and a later governor of Texas. Mary Moody Young's father built the Moody Hotel in Canadian, which still houses a few businesses. Mary died when Robert was only ten. David Young, a strict man and the first banker in Canadian, did not quite know how to control his precocious son, whom neighborhood boys nicknamed "Pumpkin" because of his auburn hair.
 

Though of Presbyterian family ties, Young attended the Baptist-affiliated Canadian Academy. In his teens, however, he was sent to Culver Military Academy in Culver, Indiana, from which he graduated at the head of his class in 1914. He then entered the University of Virginia in Charlottesville but dropped out before the end of his second year.

Early career 
Young took a job as a powder-cutter at the E. I. DuPont gunpowder plant at Carneys Point, New Jersey. On April 27, 1916, he married Anita Ten Eyck O'Keeffe, sister of Georgia O'Keeffe. They had one daughter, Eleanor "Cookie" Young, who became one of the much-publicized "Glamour Debutantes" of the Great Depression-era.

At DuPont, Young worked his way up to the treasurer's office, where he learned much about finance and advertising. By 1920, he had left DuPont and speculated in securities for a short time.

Young joined General Motors (GM) in 1922 and was made assistant treasurer in 1928. He soon became associated with GM head John J. Raskob, and left GM to handle Raskob's finances, when Raskob, who though a former Republican had been chairman of the Democratic National Committee, took a sabbatical to manage Al Smith's presidential campaign against Herbert C. Hoover.

Early in 1929 Raskob vehemently disagreed with Young's predictions of a stock market crash, and the two men parted company. Subsequently, Young netted a fortune selling stocks short of their earlier value.

In 1931, Young formed a brokerage partnership with Frank Kolbe and bought a seat on the New York Stock Exchange in order to speculate in stocks.

Film
Young acquired First Division Pictures in 1935, a distributor based in five cities in the Eastern United States, and hired future United Artists chairman Robert S. Benjamin as a lawyer. He expanded his film interest into laboratory work, as an affiliate of DuPont, national distribution and financing productions. In 1943 he acquired Producers Releasing Corporation, a B-movie production company, also known as PRC Pictures. In 1947, PRC was sold to Eagle-Lion Films. 

Young continued to own Pathé Laboratories, a motion picture processing laboratory.

Chesapeake and Ohio Railway
In 1942, in alliance with Allan P. Kirby, a retail merchant, Young owned a controlling interest in the Alleghany Corporation, a railroad holding company previously owned by the Cleveland-based Van Sweringen family, which controlled the Chesapeake and Ohio Railway, Pere Marquette Railroad, and other railroad properties.

By the end of World War II, C&O was poised to help America during its great growth during the following decades, and at mid-century was truly a line of national importance. It became more so, at least in the public eye through Young, who became "the gadfly of the rails" as he challenged old methods of financing and operating railroads, and inaugurated many forward-looking advances in technology that have ramifications to the present.

As chairman of the board of the C&O, Young launched a well-publicized campaign for the modernization of railroad passenger service. He was one of the first railroad executives to introduce lightweight, high-speed diesel passenger trains.

He served as a delegate from Rhode Island to the Republican National Convention in 1944.

In 1945, Young and Cyrus S. Eaton assembled $43,000,000 in a bid to purchase the Pullman Company operating pool, in the wake of a court decision that forced Pullman to divest that portion of its business.  Their bid ultimately failed when a Philadelphia court, acting on recommendations from the ICC, awarded the railcar operations to a consortium of the large railroads.

Young changed the C&O's herald (logo) to "C&O for Progress" to embody his ideas that C&O would lead the industry to a new day. He installed a well-staffed research and development department, which came up with ideas for passenger service that are thought to be futuristic even now, and for freight service that would challenge the growth of trucking. Fortune magazine wrote, "Young has an almost endless inventory of ideas, some pneumatic and some substantial, about passenger service. He believes that the railroads could double any previous passenger revenues if they put out a good product and merchandised it well..."

During the Young era and subsequently, C&O was headed by Cyrus S. Eaton and Walter J. Tuohy, under whose control the "For Progress" theme continued, though in a more muted way after the departure of Young. During that time, C&O installed the first large computer system in railroading, developed larger and better freight cars of all types, switched (reluctantly) from steam to diesel motive power, and diversified its traffic, which had already occurred in 1947 when it merged Pere Marquette, of Michigan and Ontario, Canada, which had been controlled by the C&O since Van Sweringen days, into the system. The PM's huge automotive industry traffic, taking raw materials in and finished vehicles out, gave C&O some protection from the swings in the coal trade, making merchandise traffic 50% of the company's haulage.

Mr. Young was jointly awarded the inaugural Horatio Alger Award for initiative and excellence in 1947.

New York Central 

In the early 1950s, Young turned his attention to the New York Central Railroad. In 1954, after a long proxy struggle and with the aid of Clint Murchison, Sr. and Sid Williams Richardson, Young gained control of the NYC and became the chairman of its board.

Young maintained offices and an apartment in New York City. However, he preferred to do most of his office work in the privacy of the den of his mansion at Newport, Rhode Island. Among his circle of friends were the Duke and Duchess of Windsor and Secretary of the Navy James Forrestal.

The dreams of Young and innovative Alfred E. Perlman, whom he selected to become president of the NYC, to form a true transcontinental line were frustrated by antitrust suits and by lack of interest on the part of the western lines to merge with the nearly bankrupt NYC.

Young donated papers to the University of Texas at Austin. For the rest of his life, he maintained lifelong correspondence with friends he had made in boyhood.

Many of Young's friends and smaller investors lost money as NYC stock prices fell. On January 25, 1958, Young, who had suffered from depression for more than fifteen years, committed suicide at his winter mansion in Palm Beach, Florida. He is interred in St. Mary's Episcopal Cemetery in Portsmouth, Rhode Island. Oddly, Young had helped to restore an old cemetery in Canadian, which was renamed in honor of his aunt, Edith Ford, who had helped to rear him after the early death of his mother. That graveyard is today known as the Edith Ford Cemeteries.

See also
 List of railroad executives

References 

 
 Meaker, M.J. Sudden Endings, 13 Profiles in Depth of Famous Suicides, Garden City, NY: Doubleday & Company, 1964), pp. 123–150: "The Little Swordsman (Robert Young)".

External links
 Chesapeake and Ohio Historical Society
 New York Central System Historical Society
 
 Robert Ralph Young Papers (MS 1738). Manuscripts and Archives, Yale University Library.

1897 births
1958 deaths
American Presbyterians
20th-century American railroad executives
American film studio executives
Businesspeople from Newport, Rhode Island
Chesapeake and Ohio Railway
Culver Academies alumni
New York Central Railroad
People from Canadian, Texas
University of Virginia alumni
1958 suicides